Malaysia competed at the 2011 Winter Universiade in Erzurum, Turkey.

Figure skating

Men

References

2011 in Malaysian sport
Nations at the 2011 Winter Universiade
Malaysia at the Winter Universiade